The Tasmanian worm eel (Scolecenchelys tasmaniensis) is an eel in the family Ophichthidae (worm/snake eels). It was described by Allan Riverstone McCulloch in 1911, originally under the genus Muraenichthys. It is a marine, temperate water-dwelling eel which is endemic to southern Australia, in the eastern Indian Ocean. It inhabits inshore waters, and forms burrows in soft sediments.

References

Fish described in 1911
Scolecenchelys